The Madang or Madang–Adelbert Range languages are a language family of Papua New Guinea. They were classified as a branch of Trans–New Guinea by Stephen Wurm, followed by Malcolm Ross. William A. Foley concurs that it is "highly likely" that the Madang languages are part of TNG, although the pronouns, the usual basis for classification in TNG, have been "replaced" in Madang. Timothy Usher finds that Madang is closest to the Upper Yuat River languages and other families to its west, but does not for now address whether this larger group forms part of the TNG family.

The family is named after Madang Province and the Adelbert Range.

History
Sidney Herbert Ray identified the Rai Coast family in 1919. In 1951 these were linked with the Mabuso languages by Arthur Capell to create his Madang family. John Z'graggen (1971, 1975) expanded Madang to languages of the Adelbert Range and renamed the family Madang–Adelbert Range, and Stephen Wurm (1975) adopted this as a branch of his Trans–New Guinea phylum. For the most part, Malcolm Ross's (2005) Madang family includes the same languages as Z'graggen Madang–Adelbert Range, but the internal classification is different in several respects, such as the dissolution of the Brahman branch.

Internal classification

The languages are as follows:
 Bargam (Mugil)
Central Madang
 Croisilles (reduced, = Northern Adelbert Range)
 Mabuso
 Mindjim
 Rai Coast (reduced; > South Madang)
 Yamben
West Madang
 Southern Adelbert Range (Sogeram and Tomul Rivers)
 Kalam (Kaironk River)
East Madang
Wasembo
Yaganon

The time depth of Madang is comparable to that of Austronesian or Indo-European.

Pronouns
Ross (2000) reconstructed the pronouns as follows:

{|
! !!sg!!pl
|-
!1
|*ya||*i
|-
!2
|*na||*ni, *ta
|-
!3
|*nu
|}

These are not the common TNG pronouns. However, Ross postulates that the TNG dual suffixes *-le and *-t remain, and suggests that the TNG pronouns live on as Kalam verbal suffixes.

Evolution

Madang family reflexes of proto-Trans-New Guinea (pTNG) etyma:

Family-wide innovations
pTNG *mbena ‘arm’ > proto-Madang *kambena (accretion of *ka-)
pTNG *mb(i,u)t(i,u)C ‘fingernail’ > proto-Madang *timbi(n,t) (metathesis)
pTNG *(n)ok ‘water’ replaced by proto-Madang *yaŋgu

Croisilles
Garuh language:
muki ‘brain’ < *muku
bi ‘guts’ < *simbi
hap ‘cloud’ < *samb(V)
balamu ‘firelight’ < *mbalaŋ
wani ‘name’ < *[w]ani ‘who?’
wus ‘wind, breeze’ < *kumbutu
kalam ‘moon’ < *kala(a,i)m
neg- ‘to watch’ < *nVŋg- ‘see, know’
ma ‘taro’ < *mV
ahi ‘sand’ < *sa(ŋg,k)asiŋ

Pay language:
in- ‘sleep’ < *kin(i,u)-
kawus ‘smoke’ < *kambu
tawu-na ‘ashes’ < *sambu
imun ‘hair’ < *sumu(n,t)
ano ‘who’ < *[w]ani

Proto-Northern Adelbert:
 *waben ‘arm, hand’ < *mbena
 *bab ‘older brother’ < *[mb]amba
 *ked ‘blood’ < *ke(nj,s)a
 *gemaŋ ‘heart’ < *kamu
 *kumaŋ ‘neck, nape’ < *kuma(n, ŋ)
 *kasin ‘mosquito’ < *kasin
 *um- ‘die’ < *kumV-
 *in- ‘sleep’ < *kin(i,u)[m]-
 *ag- 'see' ‘know, hear, see’ < *nVŋg-
 *me (+verb) ‘NEG’ < *ma- (+verb)
 *yag ‘water’ < *ok[V]
 *tak ‘leaf’ < *sasak

Kalam
Kalam language (most closely related to the Rai Coast languages):
meg ‘teeth’ < *maŋgat[a]
md-magi ‘heart’ < *mundu-maŋgV
mkem ‘cheek’ < *mVkVm ‘cheek, chin’
sb ‘excrement, guts’ < *simbi
muk ‘milk, sap, brain’ < *muku
yman ‘louse’ < *iman
yb ‘name’ < *imbi
kdl ‘root’ < *kindil
malaŋ ‘flame’ < *mbalaŋ
melk ‘(fire or day)light’ < *(m,mb)elak
kn- ‘to sleep, lie down’ < *kini(i,u)[m]-
kum- ‘die’ < *kumV-
md- < *mVna- ‘be, stay’
nŋ-, ng- ‘perceive, know, see, hear, etc’ < *nVŋg-
kawnan ‘shadow, spirit’ < *k(a,o)
nan, takn ‘moon’ < *takVn[V]
magi ‘round thing, egg, fruit, etc.’ < *maŋgV
ami ‘mother’ < *am(a,i,u)
b ‘man’ < *ambi
bapi, -ap ‘father’ < *mbapa, *ap
saŋ ‘women’s dancing song’ < *saŋ
ma- ‘negator’ < *ma-
an ‘who’ < *[w]ani

Rai Coast
Dumpu language:
man- ‘be, stay’ < *mVna-
mekh ‘teeth’ < *maŋgat[a]
im ‘louse’ < *iman
munu ‘heart’ < *mundun ‘inner organs’
kum- ‘die’ < *kumV-
kono ‘shadow’ < *k(a,o)nan
kini- ‘sleep’ < *kin(i,u)[m]-
ra- ‘take’ < *(nd,t)a-
urau ‘long’ < *k(o,u)ti(mb,p)V
gra ‘dry’ < *(ŋg,k)atata

Southern Adelbert
Sirva language:
mun(zera) ‘be, stay’ < *mVna-
kaja ‘blood’ < *kenja
miku ‘brain’ < *muku
simbil ‘guts’ < *simbi
tipi ‘fingernail’ < *mb(i,)ut(i,u)C (metathesis)
iːma ‘louse’ < *iman
ibu ‘name’ < *imbi
kanumbu ‘wind’ < *kumbutu
mundu(ma) ‘nose’ < *mundu
kaːsi ‘sand’ < *sa(ŋg,k)asiŋ
apapara ‘butterfly’ < *apa(pa)ta
kumu- ‘die’ < *kumV-
ŋg- ‘see’ < *nVŋg-

Proto-language
The following selected reconstructions of Proto-Madang by Ross (2014) are from the Trans-New Guinea database. Proto-Trans–New Guinea reconstructions are from Andrew Pawley and Harald Hammarström (2018).

{| class="wikitable sortable"
! gloss !! Proto-Madang !! Proto-Trans–New Guinea
|-
! head
| *gat(a,i)(m) || *kV(mb,p)utu; mVtVna
|-
! hair
| *imunu || *(nd,s)umu(n,t)[V]; *iti
|-
! ear
| *kaun(i) || *kand(i,e)k[V]
|-
! eye
| *amu || *ŋg(a,u)mu; *(ŋg,k)iti-maŋgV; *nVpV
|-
! nose
| *mutu(gu) || *mundu
|-
! tooth
| *make || *titi
|-
! tongue
| *mele || *me(l,n)e; *mbilaŋ
|-
! leg
| *kani(n) || *k(a,o)nd(a,o)[C]; *kitu
|-
! louse
| *[n]iman || *(n)iman
|-
! bird
| *kVbara || *yaka[i]; *n[e]i
|-
! egg
| *munaka || *mun(a,e,i)ka; *maŋgV
|-
! blood
| *ka(d,r)a; *kara || *ke(nj,s)a
|-
! bone
| *kwaten || *kondaC
|-
! skin
| *ga(n,r)a || *(ŋg,k)a(nd,t)apu
|-
! breast
| *amu(na) || *amu
|-
! tree
| *tari || *inda
|-
! woman
| *na-gali(k) || *panV
|-
! sky
| *ku(m,b)ut || *kumut, *tumuk; *samb[V]
|-
! sun
| *kamali || *kamali; *ketane
|-
! moon
| *kalam; *takun || *kal(a,i)m; *takVn[V]
|-
! water
| *yag(V) || *(n)ok[V]
|-
! fire
| *k(a,e)dap || *k(a,o)nd(a,u)p; *inda; *kambu
|-
! stone
| *namanu || *[na]muna; *kamb(a,u)na
|-
! name
| *ibi; *wañim || *imbi; *wani
|-
! eat
| *(n,ñ)a || *na-
|-
! one
| *kati(ŋ,g)a || 
|-
! two
| *arigita || *ta(l,t)(a,e)
|}

Notes

References

Pawley, Ross, & Osmond, 2005. Papuan languages and the Trans New Guinea phylum. Canberra: Pacific Linguistics. pp. 38–51.

CLDF Dataset
Z'graggen, J A. (1980) A comparative word list of the Northern Adelbert Range Languages, Madang Province, Papua New Guinea. Canberra: Pacific Linguistics. (CLDF dataset on Zenodo )

External links
The Madang–Adelbert Range languages in Multitree, showing both Z'graggen's and Wurm's classifications [no longer functional as of 2014]
ELAR archive of Documenting the Sogeram Language Family of Papua New Guinea

 
Languages of Papua New Guinea
Madang–Upper Yuat languages